Philcoxia goiasensis is a rare annual herb in the family Plantaginaceae and is endemic to the Rio da Prata area of Posse, Goiás, in Brazil.

It was discovered on 5 April 1966 by H. S. Irwin, J. Russell, J. W. Grear Jr, R. Souza and R. Reisdos Santos at  altitude in the Serra Geral de Goiás, part of the cerrado, in an open, sandy area. Unlike the other three species in the genus, P. goiasensis is remarkably smaller.

References

Flora of Brazil
Plantaginaceae
Plants described in 2000